Gerald Stanley Roberts (1 May 1908 – 16 July 1944) was an English professional footballer who played as a full back in the Football League for Tranmere Rovers.

Personal life
Roberts served as a serjeant in the 144th Regiment, Royal Armoured Corps (8th Battalion, East Lancashire Regiment) during the Second World War and was killed during the Battle of Normandy on 16 July 1944. He is buried at St. Manvieu War Cemetery, Cheux.

Career statistics

References

1908 births
1944 deaths
Military personnel from Merseyside
People from Bromborough
Footballers from Merseyside
Association football fullbacks
English footballers
English Football League players
Tranmere Rovers F.C. players
British Army personnel killed in World War II
Royal Armoured Corps soldiers
East Lancashire Regiment soldiers